John Amabile (pronounced Am-ah-bih-lay) is a Scottish interior designer, media content writer, TV presenter and event host, who has worked on TV makeover shows.

Born in 1964, Amabile grew up in the Ralston district of Paisley, Renfrewshire. After gaining a degree in Interior Design he moved to London, worked in set design for television and progressed onto appearing in many ITV design shows, as occasional chat show guest.  He appeared on the ITV show Better Homes with Carol Vorderman several times and offered design advice on the morning show, GMTV. He now appears in the ITV afternoon show, 60 Minute Makeover. In 2002 The Scotsman voted him the 10th most eligible bachelor in Scotland.

Amabile joined STV's tea-time lifestyle show The Hour as their interior design expert.

In addition to his interior design business and TV presenting, John is a Charity Ambassador for Spina Bifida Scotland.

External links
John Amabile Design
Metro Article - My First Home
John Amabile Design Facebook
John Amabile Design Instagram
John Amabile Design Twitter

Scottish interior designers
1964 births
Living people
Scottish people of Italian descent
Artists from Paisley, Renfrewshire